Street Signs may refer to:

Street signs, Traffic signs for informing drivers
 Street Signs (TV series), a CNBC business television programme
 Street Signs (album), a 2004 album by Ozomatli